Godh Bharaai was an Indian television drama series airs on Sony Entertainment Television, which premiered on 8 March 2010 to 26 August 2010.

Plot
The story portrays the life of a couple, Aastha and Shivam, who cannot conceive a child. Though it is her husband who is infertile and not her, Aastha doesn't reveal the truth to their family for his sake. Shivam is very supporting, though he urges not to do so and reveal the truth. It is Aastha who is associated with a stigma of being infertile, or baanjh, as considered in India society.
A homeless child finds his way into their lives and they decide to take care of him as their own child seeing him as a blessing and naming him Krishna, but it is later on revealed that the child was kidnapped and he was given to Shivam by a woman with a false story. As the show continues, they manage to adopt Krishna, yet Meena (the eldest daughter-in-law of the family) remains jealous of Aastha and her new adopted son. She is constantly thinking up ways to put Aastha, Shivam, and their child in difficult situations. Eventually, Aastha by a miracle becomes pregnant and Meena as well at the same time. However, Meena has a girl and Aastha has a boy.....how far will Meena go to have Aastha and her innocent children thrown out of the house, and to become the center of attention again to her father-in-law and mother-in-law?

Cast
 Pallavi Subhash as Aastha Agnihotri 
 Shakti Anand as Shivam Agnihotri
 Mohit Malik as Bharat (Shivam's business partner and best friend)
 Neha Kaul as Avni (Bharat's workaholic wife)
 Ravindra Mankani as Ramakant Agnihotri (Shivam's father)
 Mangal Kenkre / Niyati Joshi as Bhagyashree Agnihotri (Shivam's mother)
 Rajesh Jais as Gaurav Agnihotri (Shivam's elder brother)
 Aanchal Dwivedi as Meena Agnihotri (Gaurav's wife)
 Anita Kulkarni as Shivam's Widowed / Childless Aunt
 Vineet Raina
 Sailesh Gulabani

References

External links
Godh Bharaai Official Site on Sony TV

Indian television series
Sony Entertainment Television original programming
Indian television soap operas
2010 Indian television series debuts
2010 Indian television series endings